Josina Abiathar Muthemba Machel (August 10, 1945 – April 7, 1971) was a leader of FRELIMO and a significant figure in the struggle for independence in Mozambique.

Early years
Josina was born with a twin brother, Belmiro, in Vilanculos, Inhambane, Mozambique on August 10, 1945 into an assimilado family that was nevertheless active in anti-colonial work. Her grandfather (a Presbyterian lay preacher who spoke out against Portuguese colonialism),  her father, two of her sisters, and two uncles were all jailed at one point or another as a result of their participation in clandestine opposition to the Portuguese colonial administration. Her father worked as a nurse in government hospitals and this required him to periodically move the family to accommodate his job transfers. At age 7, Josina entered the primary school Dom João de Castro in Mocímboa da Praia, a school for the children of Portuguese and assimilado families. Two years later her father was transferred to the town of João Belo, and Josina enrolled in Mouzinho de Albuquerque.  After 4th grade, Josina was sent to the capital city of Lourenço Marques in order to continue her education, living with her grandmother.

Teenage years
In 1958, now 13 years old, Josina entered the commercial school Dr. Azevedo e Silva to pursue accounting. Two years later, she joined the Núcleo dos Estudantes Africanos Secundários de Mocambique (NESAM), a clandestine cultural and political organization that was founded by Eduardo Mondlane in 1949. Her political consciousness developed within the organization, which was surveilled by colonial police, until once she was 18 she fled the country with eight other students (including Armando Emilio Guebuza) intending the Tanzania-based Mozambican Liberation Front (FRELIMO). Five months later, in the month of her 19th birthday, Josina was released from jail as a result of an international campaign carried out by FRELIMO. She resumed attending secondary school, but she was watched by police agents.

Four months afterwards Josina fled Mozambique for a second time, again with a group of fellow students. From this point, Josina never saw any member of her family again. The group seeks asylum in Swaziland, where they are put in a refugee camp. With the help of a local Presbyterian pastor, also a FRELIMO sympathizer, Josina and three others are able to escape from the camp just as it is rumored that they are to be turned over to the Portuguese authorities. Traveling first by car, then by foot, and finally by bus, the four students arrive in Johannesburg, South Africa. There they make contact with a FRELIMO version of the American Underground Railroad. Next the group traveled by truck to Francistown, Botswana where they joined 14 others who are also seeking to get to Tanzania. Here they were declared “undesirable visitors” by the British colonial authorities and arrangements are made to deport them all to Swaziland. Following intense international publicity involving the Organization of African Unity and the United Nations, FRELIMO leader Eduardo Mondlane succeeded in persuading the British authorities to release the 18 students and allow them to proceed to Tanzania. The group is accordingly handed over to the United Nations High Commission for Refugees which arranged for them to travel to Lusaka, Zambia. There they spend several days in a refugee camp until they are turned over to a FRELIMO representative. After a long, arduous trip in public buses, the group finally arrives weak and undernourished in Dar es Salaam, Tanzania.

In the liberation struggle

As she reached her 20th birthday, Josina was immediately assigned responsibilities within FRELIMO's multifaceted quest for national independence.  She began work at the Mozambique Institute, a residential education center for Mozambican students in Tanzania, as assistant to the director.  The director is Janet Mondlane, the American born wife of FRELIMO president Eduardo Mondlane.  A year and a half later, Josina turns down the offer of a scholarship to undertake university studies in Switzerland and volunteers for FRELIMO's newly created Women's Branch (Destacamento Feminino).  The Women's Branch is tasked with providing women with political and military training in order that they may be fully integrated into the liberation struggle.  This initiative is little short of extraordinary in view of the fact that gender equality goes strongly against traditional African cultural norms.

Josina subsequently became one of 25 young women to go through three months of military training at Nachingwea in southern Tanzania where Mozambique liberation fighters received their military training for Mozambique guerrilla war.  Samora Machel, the future first president of Mozambique and Josina's future husband, serves as the director of this training center.

Afterwards, Josina and other women combatants combine defensive roles in guarding supplies and facilitites behind the lines of combat with community organizing roles in which they explain FRELIMO's history, goals, and purposes to the local liberated populations in the effort to win their moral and material support.  This division of labor frees up additional men for direct military actions.

During 1968 the Women's Branch evolves into a de facto social services program for FRELIMO in the liberated areas.  It organizes health centers, schools, and child care centers.  It helps families whose homes have been destroyed, and provides emotional support to wounded soldiers and peasant families traumatized by the warfare.  Josina plays a visionary role in identifying the need for child care centers to look after children who have been orphaned or separated from their families by the war.

In mid-1968 Josina is named a delegate to the Second FRELIMO Congress where she is a strong advocate for the full inclusion of women within all aspects of the liberation struggle.  She is then appointed head of the Women's Section in FRELIMO's Department of International Relations.  In this position she travels periodically to international meetings on women's rights and the role of women in development where she uses examples of FRELIMO experiences to advocate for women's equal participation in all aspects of the development process.  She is now 24 years old.

1969 proves an eventful year for Josina.  She is appointed head of FRELIMO's Department of Social Affairs where she actively develops child care and educational centers in northern Mozambique and advocates with local populations for the importance of sending girls to school.  When FRELIMO President Eduardo Mondlane is assassinated in Tanzania by Portuguese agents, Josina moves in with his wife, Janet, to provide comfort and company.  In May she marries Samora Machel at the Educational Center of Tunduru in southern Tanzania, a facility she had helped to develop.  At the end of November, Josina and Samora's only child, named Samora Junior and called Samito, is born.

During 1970 Josina begins to suffer from stomach pains and weakness.  She travels to Moscow for medical attention.  The apparent diagnosis is liver cancer.  Rest and a strict diet are recommended, but Josina returns to her duties with FRELIMO.  At the end of the year, she leaves Samito with a friend and undertakes a two-month trip, largely on foot, through Niassa Province to assess conditions and plan activities for the Department of Social Affairs.

In March 1971 Josina traveled again, this time to Cabo Delgado, to evaluate social programs being implemented there. During the marches she struggles with chronic fatigue and exhaustion.  Yet at one point she leads a meeting of more than 1,000 persons.  Tired and very thin, she decides to return to Dar es Salaam at the beginning of April.  As she crosses the border into Tanzania, she hands her pistol to a companion and says, “Comrades, I can continue no longer.  Give this to the military commander of the province so that it may contribute to the salvation of the Mozambican people.”

In Dar es Salaam, Josina becomes seriously ill on April 5.  She was taken to Muhimbili Hospital and died on April 7, 1971 at the age of 25 years.  She was buried in Kinondoni Cemetery where her uncle Mateus Muthemba, who was assassinated by Portuguese agents in 1968, is also interred.

A year later, FRELIMO declared April 7, the day of Josina's death, as National Women’s Day in Mozambique.  In March 1973 FRELIMO established the National Organization of Mozambican Women as the movement's social and political arm for women.  Inspired in part by the ideals of women's emancipation that Machel promoted, the organization continued to work for this goal following Mozambican independence in 1975.  A number of Josina's sisters in arms went on to play important leadership roles in this organization and in government.  The principal secondary school in the capital city is named after her.

References

1945 births
1971 deaths
FRELIMO politicians
Mozambican exiles
Mozambican expatriates in Tanzania
20th-century Mozambican women politicians
20th-century Mozambican politicians
Mozambican twins
African women in war
Mozambican independence activists